A yarder is piece of logging equipment that uses a system of cables to pull or fly logs from the stump to a collection point.  It generally consists of an engine, drums, and spar, but has a range of configurations and variations, such as the swing yarder.

Early Yarders

The early yarders were steam powered.  They traveled on railroads, known as "dummylines", and felled trees were dragged or "skidded" to the railroad where they were loaded onto rail cars. Popular brands included Willamette, Skagit, Washington, Tyee, or Lidgerwood and Clyde, built by Clyde Ironworks in Duluth, Minnesota. Although these machines appear to be large and cumbersome, they were highly productive.  The Clyde was capable of retrieving logs from four different points at the same time.  Each cable, or lead, was approximately 1000 feet in length.  Once the logs were attached and a clearance signal was sent for retrieval, the logs could be skidded at a speed of 1000 feet per minute, which is around 10 mph (1MPH = 88 fpm = 26.8 meter per minute).  Working conditions around these machines were very dangerous.

Modern Cable Logging

Cable logging, used primarily on the North American west coast, uses a yarder, loaders and grapple yarders.

See also
Cable logging
Swing yarder
Steam donkey – a similar, smaller logging machine
Washington Iron Works Skidder

References

External links
 Cable Logging
 Yarders on the Ritchiewiki

Logging
Log transport
Forestry equipment